Irina Andreyevna Voronkova (born 20 October 1995) is a Russian volleyball player. She is part of the Russia women's national volleyball team and was part of the national teams at the 2015 Summer Universiade in Gwangju, the 2015 Montreux Volley Masters, the 2015 European Games in Baku, the 2016 FIVB Volleyball World Grand Prix in Thailand, the 2016 Summer Olympics in Rio de Janeiro. and 2020 Summer Olympics in Tokyo.

At club level, she played for Dinamo Moscow, Dinamo Kazan and Zarechie Odintsovo before returning to Dinamo Kazan for a second spell in 2016.

Personal life
Voronkova was born into a family of volleyball players. Her father Andrei Voronkov is a retired player and former national coach, her mother Svetlana Anatolyevna and sister Anna also played for local clubs. Her father was playing for a club in Istanbul when she was born. Her first 11 years were spent in Turkey, she is fluent in Turkish.

Awards

Individuals
 2012 Junior European Championship "Best Scorer"

National team

Junior
 2015 Universiade –  Gold medal

Senior
 2019 World Cup -  Bronze medal (with Russia)

Clubs
 2012 Russian Cup –  Gold medal (with Dinamo Kazan)
 2012–13 Russian Championship –  Gold medal (with Dinamo Kazan)
 2013 Russian Cup –  Silver medal (with Dinamo Kazan)
 2013–14 Russian Championship –  Gold medal (with Dinamo Kazan)
 2013–14 CEV Women's Champions League –  Gold medal (with Dinamo Kazan)
 2014 FIVB Club World Championship –  Gold medal (with Dinamo Kazan)
 2016 Russian Cup –  Gold medal (with Dinamo Kazan)
 2016–17 CEV Cup –  Gold medal (with Dinamo Kazan)
 2016–17 Russian Championship –  Silver medal (with Dinamo Kazan)
 2020–21 Russian Championship –  Gold medal (with Lokomotiv Kaliningrad)

References

External links
profile at FIVB.org
Profile at CEV
Profile at Volleyball club Dinamo-Kazan
Profile  at VC Zarechie Odintsovo (Volleyball Centre Moscow Oblast)

1995 births
Living people
Russian women's volleyball players
Russian people of Turkish descent
Volleyball players from Istanbul
European Games competitors for Russia
Volleyball players at the 2015 European Games
Olympic volleyball players of Russia
Volleyball players at the 2016 Summer Olympics
Universiade medalists in volleyball
Universiade gold medalists for Russia
Medalists at the 2015 Summer Universiade
Volleyball players at the 2020 Summer Olympics